November 2013

See also

References

 11
November 2013 events in the United States